Óscar Javier de Paula Gamero (born 31 May 1975) is a Spanish retired footballer who played as a striker, currently a manager.

Most of his professional career was associated with Real Sociedad, for which he appeared in 11 La Liga seasons, playing 300 competitive matches and scoring 60 goals.

Playing career

Club
Born in Durango, Basque Country, de Paula began his football career with lowly clubs in Badajoz as his family hailed from Olivenza (Extremadura). Being still a junior he signed with CD Badajoz, and made his professional debut midway through the 1992–93 campaign in Segunda División.

At the beginning of 1995–96, de Paula moved back to his native region to play for La Liga side Real Sociedad. His first game came on 10 September 1995, featuring three minutes in the 2–0 home win against Sporting de Gijón. He went on to spent 11 seasons at the former, all of them in the top flight.

De Paula's time as a player for Real Sociedad was very successful although he was never a regular starter, more often than not scoring goals after coming in as a substitute, and usually made a good goals scored/minutes played ratio. Through 1999 to 2001 he netted nine goals in each season, but made only 11 appearances in 2002–03 as they finished runners-up and, in his last year, managed just six matches (280 minutes) with three goals.

In June 2006, de Paula's contract expired and he left and moved south to Cádiz CF in the second division. He descended yet another tier to Segunda División B at the end of the 2007–08 campaign after joining SD Ponferradina, scoring a total of 32 league goals in his first two seasons (16 apiece).

De Paula scored 11 times in 25 games in 2009–10 as the Castile and León team returned to division two after a three-year absence. However, Ponfe would be immediately relegated and, aged 36, he announced his professional retirement due to a recurrent knee injury, having appeared in 444 league matches both major levels combined and scored 114 goals.

International
De Paula won eight caps for Spain at under-21 level, in slightly more than one year. His first arrived on 8 October 1996, when he started the 2–1 away victory over the Czech Republic for the 1998 UEFA European Championship qualifiers.

Coaching career
In January 2012, de Paula returned to Badajoz, where he was hired as youth system coordinator. In April 2013, he started working with the Extremaduran Football Federation as a regional coach in the sub'12 and sub'16 categories, also being head director of its football academy.

On 11 June 2015, de Paula was appointed head coach of Badajoz ahead of the season in Tercera División, declaring the side's intentions to promote. They eventually reached the play-offs, but he had already been dismissed on 26 January 2016 after six matches without a win.

De Paula became the new manager of CD Palencia Balompié in mid-August 2016, after signing a one-year contract. He left the position in March 2017, following a poor string of results.

On 8 June 2019, after one season as coach of Extremadura UD's reserves, de Paula returned to Badajoz as director of football.

Honours
Ponferradina
Segunda División B: 2007–08, 2009–10

References

External links

1975 births
Living people
People from Durango, Biscay
Sportspeople from Biscay
Spanish footballers
Footballers from the Basque Country (autonomous community)
Association football forwards
La Liga players
Segunda División players
Segunda División B players
CD Badajoz players
Real Sociedad footballers
Cádiz CF players
SD Ponferradina players
Spain under-21 international footballers
Basque Country international footballers
Spanish football managers
Segunda División B managers
Tercera División managers
CD Badajoz managers